Saturday Morning may refer to:
 Saturday Morning (album), an album by Sonny Criss
 Saturday Morning (1922 film), an Our Gang comedy
 Saturday Morning (2007 film)
 Saturday Morning: Cartoons' Greatest Hits, a tribute album produced by Ralph Sall
 "Saturday Morning", a song by Eels from Shootenanny!
 "Saturday Morning", an instrumental song by Raffi from his Everything Grows album

See also
 Saturday morning cartoon, programming on American television networks.
 Saturday Morning Watchmen, a 2009 viral video
Saturday AM (magazine), a manga magazine
 Saturday (disambiguation)